David Ryding (born 5 December 1986) is an English World Cup alpine ski racer who specialises in slalom. Widely considered to be the greatest British skier of all time, he has competed for Great Britain in four Olympics, seven World Championships, and won the Europa Cup. Ryding's best World Cup result was a victory in 2022 Kitzbühel slalom, the first victory for any British athlete at that level in Alpine skiing.

Career

Early career
Born in Bretherton, Lancashire, England, Ryding started competing on dry ski slopes at age eight, first skied on snow at twelve, and continued racing on dry slopes until age 21. His younger sister Joanna was also a competitive skier who won several FIS Races before retiring after a crash in 2011.

He started competing on the Europa Cup in 2007 and made his World Cup debut in December 2009. He won his first British national senior title in 2008, defeating Alain Baxter, who was competing in his final British championships and whom Ryding described as his role model during his teenage years.

Ryding competed for Great Britain at the 2010 Winter Olympics. His best result was a 27th place in slalom. After the Games he started working with coach Tristan Glasse-Davies, who suggested that Ryding should work on his technique by training in indoor snow parks.

2013 season – 2015 season
His first points in the FIS World Cup were taken in the opening slalom race of the 2013 season, a 26th place in Levi, Finland in November 2012. In the final Europa Cup slalom of the 2013 season at Kranjska Gora, Ryding needed a solid result to win the season-long Europa Cup slalom competition. In 27th place after the first run, he posted the fastest time in run 2 to finish ninth and secured the season title. He was the first British skier to win the season title at the Alpine Skiing European second-tier.

Ryding competed at the 2014 Winter Olympics in Sochi, Russia, finishing 17th in the slalom at Rosa Khutor. Following the Games, Glasse-Davies diagnosed that Ryding's technique on left-footed turns needed to be improved: through technical training and repetitive exercise they broke down and rebuilt his left-footed technique.

He scored his second points finish in a World Cup slalom in Åre in December 2014, finishing 17th – the best World Cup result for a British alpine skier since Chemmy Alcott finished in the same position in a race at Garmisch in March 2010. He repeated the feat with a 16th place in the Madonna di Campiglio slalom later that month and 24th, 25th and 28th positions in the Adelboden, Wengen and Schladming slaloms in January 2015. Ryding finished the 2015 season in 30th place in the slalom standings.

2016 season – 2017 season
Ryding started his campaign in the 2016 season with a new personal best at the season's first slalom competition in Val-d'Isère, where he finished 12th. He went on to qualify for the second run in every World Cup slalom up to the penultimate round in Kranjska Gora and became the fourth Briton in the history of the World Cup to qualify for the World Cup Finals, after Alain Baxter, Finlay Mickel and Alcott. He finished the season 22nd in the slalom final standings.

In the first slalom of the 2017 season in Levi, Ryding finished sixth after holding fourth place after the first run. This was his first top ten finish in a World Cup race and the best result for a British alpine ski racer since Baxter took a fourth place in Åre in 2001. He followed it up with a second top ten finish at the Snow King Trophy race in Zagreb in January 2017, where he placed seventh.

Later that month, Ryding gained his first World Cup podium, and a British record in the Hahnenkamm slalom on the Ganslernhang at Kitzbühel: after holding the lead after the first run, he finished in second place, behind Austrian Marcel Hirscher and ahead of his training partner Aleksandr Khoroshilov. He became only the second British man to achieve a World Cup alpine podium, after Konrad Bartelski, who finished second in the Val Gardena downhill in 1981, and only the fourth Briton to take a World Cup podium (after Bartelski, Gina Hathorn and Divina Galica, who took top three finishes on the women's circuit in 1967 and 1968 respectively). In an interview later that year, Ryding said that as he had never completed two runs at Kitzbühel, he had engaged in extensive video analysis of Fritz Dopfer's fastest first run in the previous year's Hahnenkamm slalom ahead of the race, watching it "70 times at least" to observe how Dopfer adapted to the piste's terrain changes. He went on to finish 11th in the slalom at the 2017 World Championships in St. Moritz, the best result for a British skier at a World Championships since 2005. He finished the season in eighth place in the World Cup slalom classification.

2018 season – 2019 season

At the 2018 season's opening slalom in Levi, Ryding led the competition after the first run. In the second run, he extended his lead from 0.14 to 0.51 seconds before hitting a rut and missing a gate within sight of the finish. At a parallel slalom in Oslo on New Year's Day 2018, he took the best result of his season to that point by finishing fourth, knocking out Marcel Hirscher in the quarter finals along the way. Later that month at the Kitzbühel slalom, Ryding struggled in the first run, placing 25th, but set the fastest time on the second run to climb up to ninth place.

At the 2018 Winter Olympics in Pyongchang, South Korea, Ryding finished the first run of the slalom in 13th place before moving up to finish ninth after the second run, exactly half a second behind bronze medal winner Michael Matt. This was the best Olympic result for a British alpine skier since Martin Bell's eighth place in the men's downhill in 1988, excepting Alain Baxter's third in the men's slalom in 2002, from which he was disqualified. He went on the finish the season 11th in the World Cup slalom standings.

Ryding took one of the best World Cup results of his career so far in a slalom in Madonna di Campiglio in December 2018; after placing 27th in the first run, he set the fastest second run time to secure a fourth-placed finish. He continued his good form at the Oslo parallel slalom on New Year's Day 2019, where he knocked out Hirscher in the quarter-finals for the second year running, before defeating reigning Olympic slalom champion André Myhrer in the semi-final. He lost out in the final to Marco Schwarz after missing a gate, but his second place was the joint best World Cup result of his career so far along with his runner-up position in Kitzbühel in 2017. At the 2019 Alpine World Ski Championships, Ryding scored a new Worlds personal best by finishing ninth in the slalom, setting the third fastest time on the second run. He placed ninth in the slalom World Cup standings for the 2019 season.

2020 season – 2022 season
The start of Ryding's 2020 season echoed that of two years earlier: he once again performed strongly in the first run at the opening slalom in Levi, placing second, and started the second run quickly before crashing out near the finish. He went on to take top ten finishes at Madonna di Campiglio, where he tied for seventh - his best result of the season and Schladming, where he finished eighth. Ryding finished 13th in the season slalom standings.

Ryding opened his 2021 World Cup season at Alta Badia in December 2020, where he finished in tenth. The following month, he took the third World Cup podium finish of his career in Adelboden, initially placing eighth after the first run before moving up to third on the second run, placing 0.15 seconds behind winner Marco Schwarz. He took a third top ten finish of the season in Flachau later that month, finishing in seventh. At the World Championships in Cortina d'Ampezzo, Ryding crashed out of the first run of the slalom immediately after recording a deficit of 0.12 seconds to leader Adrian Pertl at the third intermediate time check, which would have placed Ryding in second. Ryding took 12th place in the World Cup slalom standings for the season.

On 22 January 2022 Ryding took his and Great Britain's first ever World Cup win, winning the slalom in Kitzbühel on the Ganslernhang. At the age of 35, he also became the oldest-ever winner of a World Cup slalom, and was the first Briton to win one of the Hahnenkamm Races in Kitzbühel since Gordon Cleaver took victory in the combined event at the first edition in 1931, before the establishment of the World Cup.

World Cup results

Race results
 1 win – (1 SL)
 6 podiums – (5 SL, 1 Parallel slalom)

World Championship results

Olympic results

References

External links

 
 British Ski & Snowboard Team – Dave Ryding

1986 births
Living people
British male alpine skiers
Olympic alpine skiers of Great Britain
Alpine skiers at the 2010 Winter Olympics
Alpine skiers at the 2014 Winter Olympics
Alpine skiers at the 2018 Winter Olympics
Alpine skiers at the 2022 Winter Olympics
People from the Borough of Chorley